KDUS (AM 1060) is a sports talk radio station broadcasting out of Tempe, Arizona, and serving the Phoenix metropolitan radio market. It is owned by Hubbard Broadcasting, Inc. and licensed to Phoenix FCC License Sub, LLC.  Its studios are located on North 52nd Street west of Papago Park and its transmitter is in Guadalupe.

KDUS broadcasts on the clear-channel frequency of 1060 kHz; KYW and XEEP are the dominant Class A stations on that frequency. KDUS can also be heard on HD Radio receivers at 100.7 FM KSLX-FM-HD2.

Station history
1060 AM came to life in Tempe in 1959 with the callsign KUPD (pronounced Cupid). It was owned by the Tri-State Broadcasting Co. and by the 1960s featured Phoenix veteran Bill Heywood in the morning and a full-service middle of the road format competing with KOY, which then broadcast at 550. It went to a mainstream Top 40 format in the early '70s. Around 1971, they added a simulcast on 97.9/KUPD-FM, which remained Top 40 until about 1978 when the FM station switched to rock and became a dominant presence in the Phoenix radio market.

At that time, the station became KKKQ "The New KQ" under Program Director Steve Casey (ex-KHJ and later one of the co-creators of MTV). The station played oldies with a less talk more music approach.  Staff included Joe Bailey - mornings; Don Richards - Middays; Steve Casey - Afternoons.  Don Richards would later take over as PD when Steve Casey left for MTV.

In the 1980s and early 1990s, AM 1060 cycled through various musical formats such as R&B 'KQ' from 1981 to 1987 (call letters slightly changed to KUKQ after a public outcry about having 'KKK' in the call letters for an R&B station), country ("KQ Country") from 1987 to 1989, and alternative from 1989 to 1993. During this time, KUKQ's original license was not renewed as the result of a 1988 comparative renewal hearing for KUKQ and KUPD-FM, in which the stations lost their original licenses for lying to the Federal Communications Commission about an alleged secret owner. An additional owner was ruled unfit to hold a license due to a 1982 criminal conviction in Arizona. The stations were instead awarded to former owner Jack Grimm, his wife Jackie, Ruth Clifford, and radio executive Robert Fish, doing business as G&C Broadcasting. In 1992, G&C took over KUKQ and KUPD-FM on new licenses, retaining the call letters, facilities and formats of the stations.

The new owners switched to a talk radio format in 1993 but returned to alternative again the next year after the station was sold to Sandusky Newspapers. The alternative revival did not last long before it became "KUPD2" (billed by management as "rock entertainment") for a brief period in 1996, before flipping to sports talk later that year. After the switch to sports, the station played off this handle and started referring to itself as "The Deuce," and the call letters officially shifted to KDUS in 1997. Once its identity as a sports talk station become established, KDUS stopped using "Deuce" in its slogans, and adopted "The Fan AM 1060" as its identifier ("The Fan" for short) and "The Voice of the Fan" as its slogan.

On April 1, 2013, The Fan AM 1060 changed its affiliation from Yahoo! Sports Radio to the brand new NBC Sports Radio and its branding to "NBC Sports Radio AM 1060". This lasted until August 30, 2019, when the station removed all associations with NBC Sports Radio, rebranding as simply "KDUS AM 1060" and affiliating with SB Nation Radio.

Programming
KDUS airs five hours worth of local programming between 9am and 7pm Monday through Friday. They also air The Dan Patrick Show and The Doug Gottlieb Show from Fox Sports Radio (the primary FSR affiliate, KGME, runs local programming in lieu of these shows). Afternoon, overnight, and most weekend programming is provided by SportsMap Radio. Brokered specialty programs air in random time slots at night and on the weekend. The station also has a history of carrying play-by-play for various Valley sports teams.

Play-by-play
Currently, KDUS is the Phoenix radio home of Northern Arizona University football, NAU men's basketball, and Notre Dame football. The station also broadcasts nationally syndicated NCAA and NFL football games and NCAA men's basketball games via the Sports USA Radio Network and Compass Media Networks. It is also the flagship station for Arizona State University baseball and ASU women's basketball.

KDUS was the flagship station of the National Hockey League's Phoenix Coyotes on AM from the team's first year in 1996 through the 2007-08 season, after which its rights were acquired by KGME.

KDUS carried the National Football League's Arizona Cardinals on AM from 1997 through the 2004 season, after which its rights were acquired by KTAR. They also aired broadcasts from the Arizona Hotshots of the short-lived Alliance of American Football.

Since the AM signal of KDUS doesn't completely cover the Phoenix area, particularly at night, both the Cardinals and Coyotes arranged to have their games simulcast on FM sister stations KDKB or KSLX-FM.

Previous logo
 (KDUS's logo under its previous "The Fan" branding)

References

External links

FCC History Cards for KDUS (pre-1992 license)
KDUS AM 1060 Facebook

Sports radio stations in the United States
DUS
Radio stations established in 1983
1983 establishments in Arizona
Hubbard Broadcasting